After Hours is the debut solo-album of the blues piano player Pinetop Perkins. He is backed by the New York-based blues band, Little Mike and the Tornadoes, using the Chicago blues approach. Released in 1988 by Blind Pig Records, the album, produced by Edward Chmelewski and Jerry Del Giudice, featured 12 songs, including blues standards and original material. The album was recorded in New York City at Chelsea Sound by Natasha Turner.

Musician credits
Pinetop Perkins, piano and vocals
Little Mike, Wang harmonica
Brad Vickers, bass
Tony O, guitar
Pete DeCosta, drums
Ronnie Earl, guitar on "You Don't Have to Go"

Track listing
"Got My Mojo Working" – Preston Foster (3:45)
"After Hours" – Avery Parrish (4:08)
"The Hucklebuck" – Paul Williams (2:54)
"Sit in the Easy Chair" – Pinetop Perkins (4:20)
"Thinks Like a Million" – Pinetop Perkins (3:23)
"Chicken Shack" – Jimmy Smith (3:43)
"Hoochie Coochie Man" – Willie Dixon (4:47)
"Yancey Special" – Jimmy Yancey (3:05)
"Every Day I Have the Blues" – Peter Chapman [sic] (3:26)
"Anna Lee" – Robert Nighthawk (4:29)
"You Don't Have to Go" – Jimmy Reed (4:09)
"Pinetop's Boogie Woogie" – Pinetop Smith (3:15)

References

1988 debut albums
Pinetop Perkins albums
Blind Pig Records albums